Mustai Karim (born Mustafa Safich Karimov, ; 20 October 1919 – 21 September 2005), was a Bashkir Soviet poet, writer and playwright. He was named People's Poet of the Bashkir ASSR (1963), Hero of Socialist Labour (1979), and winner of the Lenin Prize (1984) and the USSR State Prize (1972).

Biography
Karim was born on 20 October 1919 and in the village of Klyashevo (now in Chishminsky District, Bashkortostan) in an ethnic Bashkir peasant family. In 1941, he graduated from Bashkir State University, Faculty of Language and Literature. After graduation, he joined the Red Army and was sent to Novocherkassk Higher Military Command School of Communications. In May 1942, with the rank of second lieutenant sent to the 17th Motor Rifle Brigade Chief of Communications artdiviziona. In August 1942, Karim spent about six months in hospitals recuperating from severe wounds. After recovery, he returned to the forefront as a correspondent for the front-line newspapers. He became a Member of the CPSU in 1944. Throughout the Great Patriotic War Karim was at the front, and he was a correspondent for the front-line newspapers For the honor of the motherland (Ватан намусы өчен), Soviet Soldier (Sovet sugyshchysy) in Tatar.

Karim began writing in the mid-1930s. In 1938 his first book of poems, "The detachment moved", was published. The second, "Voices of Spring", was published in 1941. After that, he published more than 100 poems and prose collections, and more than 10 dramatic works.

From 1951 to 1962, Karim was the chairman of the joint BASSR. From 1962 to 1984 he served as secretary of the Union of Soviet Writers. He was a member of the Writers' Union from 1940.

His fruitful literary work Karim combined with multiple social activities: he was elected a delegate to the congress of the CPSU from 1955 to 1980, he was a deputy to the Supreme Soviet of the RSFSR 4–11 convocations, Deputy Chairman of the Presidium of the Supreme Soviet of the RSFSR, the Deputy Chairman of the Supreme Soviet of the RSFSR Supreme Soviet deputy BASSR many years he was chairman of the Bashkir Peace Committee, a member of the Committee on Lenin and State Prizes of the USSR Council of Ministers, member of the Presidential Council of the Republic of Bashkortostan.

He died after suffering a heart attack on 21 September 2005 at the Republican Cardiological Clinic in Ufa. He was buried at the Mohammedan Cemetery in Ufa.

Most famous works 
Collections of poetry and poems, "Black Water", "Return", "Europe-Asia", "time plays", "Country Ajgul", "The Kidnapping of Girl," "On the night of the lunar eclipse", "Salavat. Seven dreams through reality", " Do not leave the fire, Prometheus! "Novel" The Joy of our house, "" trivet "," Pardon, "Long, Long Childhood ". Works by Mustai Karim have been translated into dozens of languages of Russia and the world (Kyrgyz, Slovenian, Estonian etc).

Film adaptations 
 Long, Long Childhood (2004)
 My Little Sister (2019)
 Taganok Squad (2019)

Awards 
Hero of Socialist Labour (1979)
Order "For Merit to the Fatherland" 2nd degree (9 November 2004) – for outstanding contribution to the development of Russian literature and many years of creative activity
Order "For Merit to the Fatherland" 3rd degree (28 April 1995) – for services to the state, the progress made in labour, science, culture, art, and a great contribution to the strengthening of friendship and cooperation between the peoples
Two Orders of Lenin (1967, 1979)
Order of the Patriotic War, 1st degree (1985)
Order of the Patriotic War, 2nd degree (1945)
Two Orders of the Red Banner of Labour (1955, 1962)
Order of Friendship of Peoples (1984)
Order of the Red Star (1944)
Order of the Badge of Honour (1949)
Honored Art Worker of the RSFSR (1982)
People's Poet of the Bashkir ASSR (1963)
Honorary Academician of the Academy of Sciences of Bashkortostan (1992)
Lenin Prize (1984) – for the tragedy, "Do not leave the fire, Prometheus," and for the novel "The Long, Long Childhood"
USSR State Prize (1972) – for the collection of poems "vosled Years" (1971)
RSFSR State Prize of Stanislavsky (1967) – for the play "The Night of the Lunar Eclipse", staged at the Bashkir ADT
Republican Prize Salavat Yulaev (1967) – for the 1st volume of "Selected Works"
International Prize MASholokhov in Literature and Art (1999)
Honorary Diploma, Hans Christian Andersen Award (1978) – for the book "Waiting for news"

Memorials
Karim's name was given to the National Youth Theatre of the Republic of Bashkortostan (Ufa) and a street in Ufa. High school number 158 was also named after Karim. At the building where he lived, a memorial plaque was placed in honor of Karim. In Moscow, casting was completed of a monument to Karim in bronze. It will be located in Ufa, in front of the House of Trade Unions. It is not just a monument, but also include a story featuring characters from the works of the writer. The height of the monument is 6 meters in length. Part of the monument will be cast separately, and it will be assembled and welded in Ufa.

There was also a Sukhoi SSJ100 operated by Aeroflot named after Karim. However, the plane crashed on May 5, 2019 as Flight 1492.

References

External links

1919 births
2005 deaths
20th-century pseudonymous writers
20th-century Russian dramatists and playwrights
20th-century Russian male writers
20th-century Russian poets
People from Ufa Governorate
Bashkir State University alumni
Members of the Supreme Soviet of the Russian Soviet Federative Socialist Republic, 1955–1959
Members of the Supreme Soviet of the Russian Soviet Federative Socialist Republic, 1959–1963
Members of the Supreme Soviet of the Russian Soviet Federative Socialist Republic, 1963–1967
Members of the Supreme Soviet of the Russian Soviet Federative Socialist Republic, 1967–1971
Members of the Supreme Soviet of the Russian Soviet Federative Socialist Republic, 1971–1975
Members of the Supreme Soviet of the Russian Soviet Federative Socialist Republic, 1975–1980
Members of the Supreme Soviet of the Russian Soviet Federative Socialist Republic, 1980–1985
Members of the Supreme Soviet of the Russian Soviet Federative Socialist Republic, 1985–1990
Heroes of Socialist Labour
Lenin Prize winners
Recipients of the Medal of Zhukov
Recipients of the Order "For Merit to the Fatherland", 2nd class
Recipients of the Order "For Merit to the Fatherland", 3rd class
Recipients of the Order of Friendship of Peoples
Recipients of the Order of Lenin
Recipients of the Order of the Red Banner of Labour
Recipients of the Order of the Red Star
Recipients of the USSR State Prize
Socialist realism writers
Bashkir-language poets
Bashkir poets
Bashkir writers
Russian male dramatists and playwrights
Russian male poets
Russian male writers
Soviet dramatists and playwrights
Soviet male poets
Soviet male writers
Tatar poets
Tatar writers